Douglas Miller (November 3, 1904 – July 22, 1982) was a provincial politician from Alberta, Canada. He served as a member of the Legislative Assembly of Alberta from 1967 to 1975 sitting with the Social Credit caucus in both government and opposition.

Political career
Miller ran for a seat to the Alberta Legislature in the 1967 Alberta general election. He was the Social Credit candidate in the electoral district of Taber-Warner and won the seat easily defeating three other candidates.

Miller ran for a second term in office in the 1971 Alberta general election. He faced Progressive Conservative candidate Robert Bogle in a straight fight. The race was close with Miller winning by just under 700 votes.

Miller retired from provincial politics at dissolution of the legislature in 1975.

References

External links
Legislative Assembly of Alberta Members Listing

1904 births
1982 deaths
Alberta Social Credit Party MLAs
People from Raymond, Alberta